Dave or David Christian may refer to:

David Christian (historian) (1946), American historian 
David A. Christian (1948), American Vietnam war veteran
Dave Christian (1959), American ice hockey player